Shon Edri (born 9 August 2004) is an Israeli professional footballer who plays as a center-back for Liga Leumit club Hapoel Ashdod and both the Israel national under-19 team.

Club career

Maccabi Tel Aviv
Edri started his career in the Maccabi Tel Aviv's children team. On 3 March 2022 Edri made his senior debut with at the 4–0 win against Maccabi Jaffa at the Israeli State Cup.

On 18 July 2022 signed for 3 years at the senior team and immediately loaned to Hapoel Ashdod.

International career
He plays for the Israel national under-19 team.

Career statistics

Club

References

External links 
 

2004 births
Living people
Israeli footballers
Maccabi Tel Aviv F.C. players
Hapoel Ashdod F.C. players
Liga Leumit players
Footballers from Central District (Israel)
Sportspeople from Gedera
Israel youth international footballers
Association football defenders
Israeli people of Moroccan-Jewish descent